The String Quartet No. 16 in F major, Op. 135, by Ludwig van Beethoven  was written in October 1826 and was the last major work he completed. Only the final movement of the Quartet Op. 130,  written as a replacement for the Große Fuge, was composed later. The op. 135 quartet was premiered by the Schuppanzigh Quartet in March 1828, one year after Beethoven's death.

The work is on a smaller scale than the other late quartets. Under the introductory slow chords in the last movement, which is headed "Der schwer gefaßte Entschluß" (The Difficult Decision), Beethoven wrote in the manuscript "Muß es sein?" (Must it be?) to which he responds, with the faster main theme of the movement, "Es muß sein!" (It must be!). 

It is in four movements:

 Allegretto (F major)
 Vivace (F major)
 Lento assai, cantante e tranquillo (D major)
 "Der schwer gefaßte Entschluß". Grave, ma non troppo tratto ("Muss es sein?") – Allegro ("Es muss sein!") – Grave, ma non troppo tratto – Allegro (F minor – F major)

The performance of the work takes around 22–25 minutes.

Notes

External links 
 Project Gutenberg E-Book of the Quartet
 
 Performance by the Borromeo String Quartet from the Isabella Stewart Gardner Museum in MP3 format

String quartet 16
1826 compositions
Compositions in F major